Typo Attack is an educational game for the Atari 8-bit family  designed to improve the user's typing skill. It was written by David Buehler and published by the Atari Program Exchange in 1982. Buehler was seventeen years old when the game won the  Atari Star Award for the best APX program of 1982. In 1984, Atari, Inc. moved Typo Attack into its official line as a cartridge. 

After writing Typo Attack, Buehler had two action games published by the Atari Program Exchange in 1983: Wyzle! and Impact.

Gameplay
The game takes place on a single screen, divided up into multiple columns. At the bottom of each column is a letter or punctuation symbol and various enemies appear randomly at the top of the columns. Players must press the corresponding letter in a column in order to make the letter fire at the advancing enemies. If an enemy reaches the bottom of the screen they will remove part of the shield around the letter, and if it is eaten away completely the player will lose a life. Depending on the level, the letters assigned to each column will change at irregular intervals.

Development
A version was planned for the unreleased Atari CX-3000 Graduate, an add-on to turn the Atari 2600 into a home computer.

References

1982 video games
Atari Program Exchange software
Atari 8-bit family games
Atari 8-bit family-only games
Atari 8-bit family software
Fixed shooters
Video games developed in the United States
Typing video games